Don Roberts is a former Canadian politician, who represented the electoral district of Porter Creek North in the Yukon Legislative Assembly from 2000 to 2002.

He was elected as a member of the Yukon Liberal Party in the 2000 election. He served as Minister for Health. In 2002 he was one of three MLAs, along with Mike McLarnon and Wayne Jim, who resigned from the Liberal Party caucus. The resignations were designed to protest the leadership of Pat Duncan, sending Duncan's government into a minority. He did not run in the resulting 2002 election.

References

Year of birth missing (living people)
Living people
Yukon Liberal Party MLAs
Politicians from Whitehorse